John Michael Clarke (born 25 December 1948) is a former English cricketer.  Clarke was a left-handed batsman who bowled right-arm medium-fast.  He was born at Barcombe, Sussex.

Clarke made a single first-class appearance for Sussex against Hampshire at the United Services Recreation Ground, Portsmouth, in the 1969 County Championship.  In Sussex's first-innings of 159, Clarke was run out for a duck, while in their second-innings of 233, he was dismissed for the same score by Bob Cottam.  Hampshire won the match by 8 wickets.  This was his only major appearance for Sussex.

References

External links
John Clarke at ESPNcricinfo
John Clarke at CricketArchive

1948 births
Living people
People from Barcombe
English cricketers
Sussex cricketers